Ramani Gabharu (1656  – 1684), was the princess of Kingdom of Assam and the first wife of titular Mughal emperor Muhammad Azam Shah. She was sent to the Mughal harem as part of the Treaty of Ghilajharighat and was renamed Rahmat Banu Begum .

She was the only daughter of Chaopha Sutamla, king of Ahom kingdom and his wife Pakhori Gabharu, the daughter of Momai Tamuli Borbarua. She was the niece of Lachit Borphukan and Laluksola Borphukan. She famously resisted Laluksola Borphukan's plan to hand over Guwahati to her husband.

Early life
Ramani Gabharu was born as an Ahom princess, and was the only daughter of Swargadeo Jayadhwaj Singha, king of Ahom Dynasty and his wife Pakhori Gabharu, the Tamuli Kuwari. Her birth name was Ramani Gabharu, and was also known as Nangchen Gabharu and Maina Gabharu.

She was the maternal granddaughter of Momai Tamuli Borbarua, an able administrator and the commander-in-chief of the army in the Ahom kingdom, and the niece of Lachit Borphukan and Laluksola Borphukan, known for their participation in the Battle of Saraighat that thwarted a drawn-out attempt by Mughal forces under the command of Ram Singh I to take back Kamrup.

Marriage
When Mir Jumla invaded Jayadhwaj's kingdom and defeated him in the war, he made a truce with Mir Jumla on a condition for which his daughter Ramani Gabharu had to be sent to the Mughal's imperial harem when she was only six, along with the princess of the Tipam King as ransom. Her father had to bound to deliver her daughter as a war indemnity at Aurangzeb's court on 15 January 1663. She was given the Muslim name of Rahmat Banu Begum after her conversion to Islam, and was brought up in the imperial harem. Five years later, she was married to Aurangzeb's son Muhammad Azam Shah on Sunday, 13 May 1668, with a dowry of 1,80,000 rupees at Delhi.

By the time, Guwahati was recovered from the Mughals by king Supangmung with the help of famous Ahom general Lachit Borphukan in the famous battle of Battle of Saraighat. Lachit Borphukan earned much fame by defeating famous Mughal general Ram Singha in this battle. Had there been no Lachit Borphukan, the general of the Ahom Army, it would have been utterly impossible on the part of the Ahoms to win the battle. In that case Guwahati would have remained as the part of Mughal Empire as before. Even after being defeated in the hands of Lachit Bagphukanas, Ram Singh I spoke highly of the manifold qualities of the Ahom Soldiers.

Then, after a period of some years, it was proposed that Guwahati should be given to the Mughals and in return Laluksola, the viceroy of Ahoms at Guwahati will be made the king. When Ramani Gabharu learned of it, she wrote a letter to her maternal uncle Laluksola Borphukan warning him not to do such an act of betrayal. However, Laluksola Borphukan did not listen to his noble niece.

Death
She is thought to have died in 1684 due to some unknown disease, at the age of 27. Though some put forward the theory that Ramani Gabharu was none other than Pari Bibi. This would put her death in 1678.

References

Bibliography
 

1662 births
Women of the Mughal Empire
Indian female royalty
Year of death unknown
Mughal nobility
17th-century Indian women
17th-century Indian people
Wives of Muhammad Azam Shah
Indian princesses
Mughal royalty
Mughal royal consorts
People from Assam